Carlos Alberto Aguilera Nova (born 21 September 1964) is a Uruguayan former professional footballer who played as a forward. He represented Uruguay at an international level, earning a total of 64 caps.

Club career
Aguilera began his career playing for River Plate Montevideo, from 1980 to 1982. From 1983 to 1985 he played in Club Nacional de Football, then passed to Independiente Medellín (1985), returned to Nacional (1986), Racing Club of Argentina (1986), again in Nacional (1987), and Tecos of Mexico (1987–88). In 1988, he went to Europe to play for Italian clubs Genoa C.F.C. (1989–92), and then A.C. Torino (1992–94). He returned to C.A. Peñarol in 1994, where he played until 1999, finishing a brilliant career. Whilst at Genoa he memorably scored two goals at Anfield to knock Liverpool out of the 1991–92 UEFA Cup.

In his second phase with Peñarol, he was Uruguayan Champion in 1994, 1995, 1996, 1997, and 1999.

International career
Aguilera also played for the Uruguay national team, which won the Copa América in 1983. He represented Uruguay at the FIFA World Cup level in 1986, in Mexico, and 1990, in Italy.

Career statistics

International goals
Scores and results list Uruguay's goal tally first.

References

1964 births
Living people
1986 FIFA World Cup players
1990 FIFA World Cup players
1983 Copa América players
1989 Copa América players
Peñarol players
Club Nacional de Football players
Expatriate footballers in Argentina
Expatriate footballers in Colombia
Expatriate footballers in Italy
Expatriate footballers in Mexico
Association football forwards
Genoa C.F.C. players
Categoría Primera A players
Independiente Medellín footballers
Footballers from Montevideo
Uruguayan Primera División players
Argentine Primera División players
Racing Club de Avellaneda footballers
Club Atlético River Plate (Montevideo) players
Serie A players
Torino F.C. players
Liga MX players
Tecos F.C. footballers
Uruguay international footballers
Uruguay under-20 international footballers
Uruguayan expatriate footballers
Uruguayan expatriate sportspeople in Argentina
Uruguayan expatriate sportspeople in Colombia
Uruguayan expatriate sportspeople in Italy
Uruguayan expatriate sportspeople in Mexico
Uruguayan footballers
Copa América-winning players